The Tupolev OOS was a Soviet concept for an air-launched, single-stage-to-orbit spaceplane.  The OOS's carrier aircraft, the Antonov AKS, was a twin-fuselage plane consisting of two An-225 fuselages and was powered by 18 Progress D-18T turbofan engines, with the placements of the engines both above and below the wings. The OOS was to be carried under the AKS's raised center wing. The launch system was proposed in the late 1980s, but never developed past the design stage.

See also
 Buran programme
 Scaled Composites Stratolaunch
 Conroy Virtus

References

External links
Soviet Designed Air Launched Space Shuttle Rocket from a dual Fuselage Antonov An-225, video rendering by Hazegrayart

Spaceplanes
Soviet and Russian military aircraft
Single-stage-to-orbit